Abdulaziz Al-Jalabi (born 11 June 1997), is a Qatari professional footballer who plays as a forward, most recently for Qatar Stars League side Al-Sadd.

Career statistics

Club

References

External links
 

1997 births
Living people
Qatari footballers
Association football forwards
Al Sadd SC players
Qatar Stars League players